Doktor Sen (Doctor Dream) is the debut album by Slovak singer Miroslav Žbirka, released on OPUS in 1980.

Track listing

Official releases
 1980: Doktor Sen, LP, MC, OPUS, #9116 100
 1999: Doktor Sen, CD, Bonton, No. 49 2930
 2008: Slovenské legendárne albumy II: Doktor Sen, CD, SME, #91 0017
 2008: Doktor Sen: 2CD Collectors Edition, bonus CD, OPUS, #91 2716

Credits and personnel

 Miroslav Žbirka – lead vocal, writer, acoustic guitar
 Marika Gombitová – lead vocal, back vocal
 Ladislav Lučenič – bass, guitar, percussion, back vocal
 Dušan Hájek – drums, percussion
 Jozef Hanák – harmonica, sound engineer
 Ján Lehotský – keyboards, back vocal
 Štefan Danko – executive producer

 Ján Lauko – record producer
 Karel Witz – guitar
 Martin Karvaš – synthesizer
 Kamil Peteraj – lyrics
 Július Kinček – liner notes
 Tibor Borský – art work

Accolades
In 2007, Doktor Sen ranked 19th on the list of the 100 Greatest Slovak Albums of All Time.

Export release

The initial export version of the album, entitled Doctor Dream, was issued in 1981 on OPUS Records. Like a Hero, an edited version excluding one track, was released in 1982 on RCA Victor in Germany. While a similar, also 11 track release named just Miro, was issued in the Netherlands on Dureco Benelux.

Track listing

Official releases
 1981: Doctor Dream, LP, MC, OPUS, #9113 1148
 1982: Like a Hero, LP, MC, RCA Victor, #PL 28487
 1982: Miro, LP, MC, Dureco Benelux, No. 88 038

References

General

Specific

External links 
 

1980 debut albums
1981 albums
Miroslav Žbirka albums